Anilios systenos, also known as the sharp-snouted blind snake, is a species of blind snake that is endemic to Australia. The specific epithet systenos “tapering to a point” refers to the shape of head and snout.

Description
The snake grows to an average of about 27 cm in length. The long, slender body is unpigmented, with the upperparts slightly darker than the underparts.

Behaviour
The species is oviparous.

Distribution
The species occurs in the Geraldton Sandplains bioregion of the Mid West region of Western Australia. The type locality is 15 km east of Geraldton.

References

 
systenos
Snakes of Australia
Reptiles of Western Australia
Reptiles described in 2017
Taxa named by Ryan J. Ellis